Existence Is Futile is the second album released by American technical death metal band Revocation. The album was released September 29, 2009, by Relapse Records.

Track listing

Personnel
Revocation
David Davidson - lead vocals, guitars
Anthony Buda - bass, backing vocals
Phil Dubois-Coyne - drums

References

2009 albums
Relapse Records albums
Revocation (band) albums